Kadirpur is a Hamlet of Dildarnagar Kamsar located in Ghazipur District of Uttar Pradesh, India.

References 

Villages in Ghazipur district